Diaconis can refer to:
 Paulus Diaconis (Paul the Deacon), 8th century monk and scholar
 Persi Diaconis, American magician turned mathematician
 Freedman–Diaconis rule, a statistical rule developed by Persi Diaconis and David Freedman
 John S. Diaconis, American attorney